Rolando Zanni (8 February 1914 – 6 April 2000) was an Italian alpine skier. He competed in the men's combined event at the 1936 Winter Olympics.

References

External links
 

1914 births
2000 deaths
Italian male alpine skiers
Olympic alpine skiers of Italy
Alpine skiers at the 1936 Winter Olympics
Sportspeople from the Province of Pistoia